The Queen's Birthday Honours 1975 for Australia were appointments to recognise and reward good works by citizens of Australia and other nations that contribute to Australia. The Birthday Honours are awarded as part of the Queen's Official Birthday celebrations and were announced on 17 June 1975 in Australia.

The recipients of honours are displayed as they were styled before their new honour and arranged by honour with grades and then divisions i.e. Civil, Diplomatic and Military as appropriate.

† indicates an award given posthumously.

Order of Australia

Companion (AC)

General Division 
 Charles Manning Hope Clark
 Sir Gordon Colvin Lindesay Clark, 
 Herbert Cole Coombs
 The Hon. Eric Elliott Reece
 Joan Alston Sutherland, 
 Patrick Victor Martindale White

Military Division

Navy 
 Admiral Sir Victor Alfred Trumper Smith,

Army 
 Lieutenant General Francis George Hassett,

Officer (AO)

General Division 
 Geoffrey Malcolm Badger
 Giacomo Alberto Bayutti
 Geoffrey Norman Blainey
 Allan George Gibbs
 Byron Arthur Kakulas
 Phillip Garth Law, 
 Allan George Moyes
 David Horace Forde Scott

Military Division

Navy 
 Rear Admiral Geoffrey Vernon Gladstone,

Army 
 Major General Stuart Clarence Graham, 
 Major General Cedric Maudsley Ingram Pearson, 
 Major General Alan Bishop Stretton,

Air Force 
 Air Vice Marshal Geoffrey Thompson Newstead,

Member (AM)

General Division 
 Irene Constance Alexander
 Stanley Foch Arneil
 Alfred Richard Baring
 Phyllis Eva Bonython
 Henry Edward Boord
 Elizabeth Bryan
 Eric Elwin Samuel Clayton
 Doris Catherine Condon
 Joyce Cummings
 Herbert John Dillon
 Athel D'Ombrain
 Henry Arthur James Donegan
 Ernst Bert Gilbert
 James Timothy Gleeson
 Phyllis Mervyne Gration
 Irene Adelaide Greenwood
 William Herbert Hayes
 Kevin Heinz
 Charles Dennison King
 Alfred Morris Kingston
 Keith Langford-smith 
 Louis Fleming Leake
 Peter Leon Lehmann
 Ida Victoria Lowndes
 Elwin Augustus Lynn
 James Phillip McAuley
 Ernst Joseph McDermott
 Thomas Osborne McGee
 David Henry McHugo
 David Henry McKenzie
 Ronald John Martin
 John Stuart Maslin
 Hilda Mary Morieson
 George Rowland Mountain
 Richard William Murden
 Ralph John Naughton
 Frank Austin Pallin
 William Herbert Perkins
 Graham Martin Pizzey
 Thomas Dudley Room
 Harold Noel Roscrow
 Dorothea Sharks
 Maurice John Shapiro
 Marjorie Smart
 Ernst Smith
 Keth Thomas Smith
 Harold James Souter
 Graham Selwyn Stephenson 
 Kenneth Wilberforce Tribe
 Reginald Nelson Walker
 Mauriel Mary Weir
 Margaret Elleen Wilkinson
 Catherine Mary Wilson

Military Division

Navy 
 Captain Charles Ivan Faherty, 
 Captain Eric Eugene Johnston, 
 Acting Captain Barbara Denis Macleod, WRANS
 Lieutenant Commander James Anthony Failey, 
 Warrant Officer Quartermaster Gunner Derek Berry
 Warrant Officer Engine Room Artificer Robert John Cox 
 Warrant Officer Radio Supervisor Reginald Edwin Foden
 Warrant Officer Underwater Control Reginald Paul Jacobs 
 Chief Petty Officer Quartermaster Gunner Alan George Meyer

Army 
 Colonel Catherine Mary Fowler
 Colonel Kevin Donal Whiting, 
 Major Thelma Beryl Crough, 
 Major James Messini
 Captain Peter James Bayliss
 Captain Trevor Christopher Bayo
 Captain Stanley Earle Jennings
 Captain Neville John Opie
 Warrant Officer Class One Brian Bede Agnew
 Warrant Officer Class One Patrick David Buckley
 Warrant Officer Class One Clement Kealey
 Warrant Officer Class Two Maximilian Erich Halbreiner
 Sergeant Patrick David Griffin
 Sergeant Michael George Holloway
 Sergeant Adrian Sherriff
 Sergeant Leonard Birkett Waddington
 Corporal Rose Mary Finn

Air Force 
 Air Commodore James Hilary Flemming
 Air Commodore Arthur Henry Pickering
 Group Captain David Wilson Hitchins
 Wing Commander William Darcy John Monaghan
 Flight Lieutenant Aubury Alfred Quirk
 Warrant Officer Frederick William Huntley
 Warrant Officer Patrick Henry Reinhart
 Flight Sergeant Jusuf John Khan

Other 
 Group Officer Dawn Desire Parsloe

References

1975 awards
Orders, decorations, and medals of Australia